The 1934 Temple Owls football team was an American football team that represented Temple University as an independent during the 1934 college football season. In its second season under head coach Pop Warner, the team compiled a 7–0–2 record in the regular season before losing to Tulane in the 1935 Sugar Bowl. In all 10 games, the Owls outscored opponents by a total of 220 to 57. The team played its home games at Temple Stadium in Philadelphia.

The team featured one of the best backfields in school history in "Dynamite Dave" Smukler, Glenn Frey, Danny Tester, and Wilfred H. Longsderff. Smukler was selected by the Associated Press as the third-team fullback on the 1934 All-America college football team.

Schedule

References

Temple
Temple Owls football seasons
Temple Owls football